INS Airavat is the third  amphibious warfare vessel of the Indian Navy.

History
INS Airavat was built by Garden Reach Shipbuilders & Engineers in Kolkata at Yard 2016. She began sea trials in July 2008 after completing basin trials in May. She was commissioned at the Eastern Naval Command in Visakhapatnam on 19 May 2009, by the Chief of Naval Staff, Admiral Sureesh Mehta. She is named for the mount of god Indra, the elephant Airavata, as mentioned in the Rigveda.

Design
Safety features aboard the Airavat include anti-roll flume stabilisation system, smoke curtains to impede spreading of smoke and toxic gases in case of fire, as well as battle damage control systems. Fully loaded, she can operate independently at high seas for up to 45 days.

While primarily designed for amphibious assault operations, Airavats missions also include humanitarian assistance & disaster relief (HADR) during natural disasters, including tsunamis, cyclones and earthquakes. She has a fully functioning hospital on board, the capacity to carry 500 soldiers, and can provide stern refuelling for other naval vessels.

Primary suppliers for her equipment are Bharat Electronics Limited, Kirloskar, Larsen & Toubro, Hindustan Aeronautics Limited, Keltron and the Godrej Group.

Deployments
On 11 July 2011, INS Airavat made a goodwill visit to Sihanoukville, Cambodia. Between 19 and 28 July 2011, she made courtesy calls at Nha Trang and Hai Phong in Vietnam.

On 1 May 2016, INS Airavat arrived at Brunei to participate in the ADMM Plus (ASEAN Defence Ministers Meeting Plus) Exercise on Maritime Security and Counter Terrorism(Ex MS & CT) which took place from 1–9 May 2016. During the exercise, she engaged with participating navies from Brunei, Singapore, Indonesia, Philippines, Thailand, Vietnam, Malaysia, Myanmar, China, Japan, Russia, Australia, Republic of Korea and the United States, through professional interactions in harbor and complex operations at sea.

In November 2020, as part of Mission Sagar-II, INS Airavat delivered food aid to Sudan, South Sudan, Djibouti and Eritrea.

References

Shardul-class tank landing ships
Amphibious warfare vessels of the Indian Navy
Ships built in India